Jeffrey Scott Cronenweth,  (born January 14, 1962) is an American cinematographer based in Los Angeles, California who is known for his role as the director of photography on the David Fincher films Fight Club, The Social Network, The Girl with the Dragon Tattoo and Gone Girl (two of which earned him Academy Award for Best Cinematography nominations in 2010 and 2011). He graduated from the USC School of Cinematic Arts and was invited to join the cinematographers branch of the Academy of Motion Picture Arts and Sciences in 2004. He is the son of Jordan Cronenweth, one of the most influential cinematographers in motion picture history.

Career
Jeff worked with father Jordan Cronenweth (cinematographer most notable for Blade Runner) as a camera loader and second assistant camera during high school, working his way up to first assistant camera and then camera operator until the mid-1990s.  The first major motion picture where he acted as a DP was Fight Club.  Other notable feature films on which he worked as a DP are One Hour Photo, K-19: The Widowmaker, Down With Love, The Social Network, Hitchcock, The Girl with the Dragon Tattoo, and Gone Girl.

Jeff and his brother Tim ("The Cronenweths") have worked as a director/DP team, doing numerous commercials and music videos in and out of Los Angeles.

In 2011, Cronenweth was nominated for an Academy Award for Best Cinematography for his work on The Social Network.

In 2012, Cronenweth was nominated for a second time for an Academy Award for Best Cinematography for his work on The Girl with the Dragon Tattoo.

Style
Cronenweth is known for his use of light or the absence of and composition to elegantly weave a visual language throughout a story as shown in his work on Fight Club, The Social Network, The Girl with the Dragon Tattoo, and Gone Girl and including many of the iconic music videos and commercials he has photographed. On filming Fight Club, Cronenweth stated: "Whether we were inside or outside, we always wanted to embrace depth of field or the lack of as a key story telling element in guiding an audiences focus on what we wanted them to embrace."

Filmography

Film

Television

Music videos

Awards and nominations

References

External links
 
 Method Studios Commercials
 "Movie Maker" interview

1962 births
American cinematographers
Living people
People from Los Angeles